Gregoriussen is a surname. Notable people with the surname include:

Liffa Gregoriussen (1904–1992), Faroese fashion designer and feminist
Jákup Pauli Gregoriussen (born 1932), Faroese architect
J.P. Gregoriussen (1845–1901), Faroese poet and writer

See also
Nils Gregoriussen Skilbred (1860–1943), Norwegian politician